Silver Creek is an unincorporated community in Floyd County, Georgia, United States. It is part of the Rome, Georgia Metropolitan Statistical Area.

History
A post office called Silver Creek has been in operation since 1880. The community took its name from nearby Silver Creek.

Major highways
  U.S. Route 411
  State Route 1
  State Route 101

References

Unincorporated communities in Georgia (U.S. state)
Unincorporated communities in Floyd County, Georgia